Pseudomusonia rapax is a species of praying mantis native to Costa Rica and Venezuela.

See also
List of mantis genera and species

References

Mantidae
Insects of Central America
Invertebrates of Venezuela
Insects described in 1894